The Nevada-California-Oregon Railway Co. General Office Building, commonly known as the N.C.O. Building, is a historic site in Alturas, California, listed on the National Register of Historic Places. It was built 1917–1918 to serve as the headquarters of the Nevada-California-Oregon Railway. It has been an Elks Lodge since at least 1974.

History
In 1880, the Nevada and Oregon Railroad was founded; it was sold in 1884 and renamed the Nevada–California–Oregon Railway (N.C.O.). N.C.O. began regular rail service for Alturas began on December 1, 1908. In 1917, N.C.O. sold part of its line, extending from Reno, Nevada, to Hackstaff, California, to Western Pacific Railroad for $700,000. Since N.C.O. based its headquarters in Reno, the company needed a new location along its remaining lines.

On August 24, 1917, the Alturas Plaindealer ran a feature on the proposed headquarters with an architect's drawing. The project was estimated at $40,000, and stone would be sourced from a quarry in Sisson, California. Construction began sometime shortly after. On January 30, 1918, N.C.O. staff arrived in Alturas; because the new building was not yet completed, they worked in offices in the Fitzgerald House. It is not apparent when construction was completed, but it was probably later in 1918.

In 1967, the N.C.O. Building was included in a California survey of historic sites in the state. The building was added to the National Register of Historic Places on September 6, 1974. Since at least 1974, the building has served as an Elks Lodge. The main exterior modifications to the building have been the addition of a BPOE (Benevolent and Protective Order of Elks) sign over the porch and a bulletin board.

Design
The design of the building is transitional between the older Mission Revival style and the newer Spanish Colonial Revival style. The building's Mission Revival elements are its arches and curved gable; Churrigueresque ornamentation at the side entrance shows Spanish Colonial Revival influence. The roof is tile and at the corner is a bell tower. At the time of construction, the belfry was in need of a set of bells; a single one is metal, but the rest are wooden dummies turned by the company. The building is fronted with a well maintained lawn along the east face.

See also

National Register of Historic Places listings in Modoc County, California

References

Bibliography

External links

Commercial buildings on the National Register of Historic Places in California
Commercial buildings completed in 1918
Mission Revival architecture in California
Spanish Colonial Revival architecture in California
Buildings and structures in Modoc County, California
National Register of Historic Places in Modoc County, California